The Islamabad–New Delhi hotline is a system that allows direct communication between the leaders of India and Pakistan. The hotline, according to the media sources, was established in 1971, shortly after the end of the 1971 war.  The hotline linked the Prime minister's Office in Islamabad via Directorate-General of Military Operations (DGMO) to Secretariat Building in New Delhi.

The hotline has seldom been used by the military leadership of India and Pakistan, even at the time of an escalation of tension. It is also called Hotline Linkage. In regard to the Moscow–Washington hotline model, the hotline serves the purpose, as both technological and strategic rationale, for establishing the link between two countries. The Islamabad–Delhi hotline is a secure communication link over which many procedural operations are obtained in different formats.

History

According to the Indian media sources, the hotline was established by the governments of India and Pakistan shortly after the end of the 1971 war. The foreign ministries of India and Pakistan signed the mutual agreement for the implementation of the hotline. The hotline was modelled directly on the Moscow–Washington hotline which was established in 1963. The hotline became operational in the 1970s after both countries' foreign ministries transmitted the messages.

The first usage of the hotline was in 1991 between the militaries of India and Pakistan to work on confidence-building measures. The second usage of the hotline was in 1997, when both countries informed each other on trade issues. In 1998, when both countries had publicly conducted nuclear tests (Pokhran-II, Chagai-I & Chagai-II), the hotline was extensively used between the leaders of both countries. Since 2005, the hotline has been used by each country to inform the other of their nuclear missile tests in the region.

Other hotlines

There are other hotlines for issues involving terrorism (established in 2011), cyber warfare and record communications on prevention of nuclear risk. The nuclear hotline was set up on 20 June 2004, which was initiated by President Pervez Musharraf with the assistance of United States military officers (as advisors) in his regime.

See also
 Moscow–Washington hotline
 Beijing–Washington hotline
 Seoul–Pyongyang hotline

References

Communication circuits
India–Pakistan relations
1971 in politics
History of the foreign relations of Pakistan
History of Islamabad
History of Delhi (1947–present)
Military communications of India
Hotline between countries